The Midnight Sun Game is an amateur baseball game played every summer solstice at Growden Memorial Park in Fairbanks, Alaska, United States.  Because the sun is out for almost 24 hours a day, the game starts at about 10:30 at night and completes around 1:30 the next morning.  However, because Fairbanks's summer time zone differs by about an hour from local solar time, coupled with the state's observance of daylight saving time, the game may not actually last until solar midnight, at about 1:53.  Famous players who have appeared in the game include Tom Seaver, Dave Winfield, Terry Francona, Harold Reynolds, Jason Giambi, and Bill "Spaceman" Lee.

After Noel Wien's arrival in 1924, he noted, "The baseball team played on weekends, and on June 21 and July 4 they always started a game at midnight sharp, just to indicate that this was the farthest city in the country."

The first game was in 1906. Artificial light has never been used.  The sun does dip below the horizon for about an hour. Since 1960, the game has been hosted by the Alaska Baseball League's Fairbanks-based Alaska Goldpanners.  The opposing team may be another ABL team, but frequently an NCAA or other collegiate summer team from another league is invited to play.

In 2020 the Goldpanners pulled out of the contest due to the coronavirus pandemic and local amateur squads played the game instead, with a local American Legion Baseball squad facing the local town team baseball squad. The game has never been rained out; the game narrowly avoided a rainout in 2020 after heavy downpours flooded the field earlier in the day, but the two competing teams were unwilling not to let the game go forward and cleared the field to the best of their ability to allow the game to go on.

For 2021, the game expanded into a Midnight Sun Tournament, with a doubleheader consisting of the final of the American Legion Baseball tournament leading into the Goldpanners' Midnight Sun Game.

Game results
Through 1959, the Midnight Sun Game featured various teams from the Fairbanks area. In 1960, the game became exclusively hosted by the Alaska Goldpanners. Although the Midnight Sun Game has been played since 1906, only games hosted by the Goldpanners are listed, with the exception of the 2020 contest.  The Goldpanners are 47-14 all-time.

References

External links
 

1906 in baseball
1906 establishments in Alaska
Annual events in Alaska
Baseball in Alaska
Sports in Fairbanks, Alaska
Culture of Fairbanks, Alaska